Maurice Bigué (3 July 1886 – 25 April 1972) was a French footballer. He played in six matches for the France national football team from 1911 to 1914. He was also named in France's squad for the football tournament at the 1912 Summer Olympics, but the French side withdrew from the competition.

References

1886 births
1972 deaths
French footballers
France international footballers
Place of birth missing
Association football midfielders